Music World Ltd was an independent record label established in New Zealand by Hoghton Hughes in 1967. Hughes had also founded the Master label in 1968, and ran both until it was absorbed into Music World. Many notable New Zealand artists started on the label, such as Suzanne Prentice and Noel Parlane. The goal of the label was to create "low-price, mass market music".

References

1967 establishments in New Zealand